Modesto Martínez (born 18 February 1934) is a Mexican water polo player. He competed in the men's tournament at the 1952 Summer Olympics.

References

1934 births
Living people
Mexican male water polo players
Olympic water polo players of Mexico
Water polo players at the 1952 Summer Olympics
Place of birth missing (living people)
20th-century Mexican people